Turning Red is a 2022 American computer-animated fantasy comedy film produced by Pixar Animation Studios and distributed by Walt Disney Studios Motion Pictures. It was directed by Domee Shi (in her feature directorial debut) and produced by Lindsey Collins, from a screenplay written by Shi and Julia Cho, and a story by Shi, Cho, and Sarah Streicher. The film marks the first Pixar feature film solely directed by a woman. It stars the voices of Rosalie Chiang, Sandra Oh, Ava Morse, Hyein Park, Maitreyi Ramakrishnan, Orion Lee, Wai Ching Ho, Tristan Allerick Chen, and James Hong. Set in Toronto, Ontario in 2002, the film follows Meilin "Mei" Lee (Chiang), a 13-year-old Chinese-Canadian student who transforms into a giant red panda when she experiences any strong emotion, due to a hereditary curse.

Shi, who previously directed the short film Bao (2018), developed the film as her experiences growing up in Toronto. She pitched three concepts, including Turning Red, to Pixar in October 2017. Development began in May 2018 when Shi was announced as writer and director of a full-length film; several Pixar animators visited locations around Northern California gathering inspiration and visual references. The design and animation were inspired by anime works. To capture these anime influences, hand-drawn 2D animated effects were added atop Pixar's 3D animation. Development on Turning Red lasted for four years, on an approximate $175 million budget, becoming the fastest production for a Pixar film. Ludwig Göransson composed the film's musical score for his first animated film with Billie Eilish and Finneas O'Connell performing original songs for the film.

Turning Red was first shown in London at Everyman Borough Yards on February 21, 2022 as a special screening, and in Toronto at TIFF Bell Lightbox on March 8. It premiered at the El Capitan Theatre in Los Angeles on March 1, and was released on March 11 on the Disney+ streaming service and at limited theaters. It was released theatrically in most countries without Disney+, grossing over $20 million, and became a critical success. The film was nominated for Best Animated Feature Film at the 80th Golden Globe Awards and 95th Academy Awards (only to lose to Guillermo del Toro's Pinocchio).

Plot
In 2002 Toronto, 13-year-old Meilin "Mei" Lee, who lives with her parents, Ming and Jin, helps take care of the family's temple dedicated to their ancestor Sun Yee, and works to make her mother proud. She hides her personal interests from Ming, such as the fact that she and her friends Miriam, Priya, and Abby are fans of the boy band 4*Town. One night when Ming, who is strict and overprotective, discovers Mei's crush on Devon, the local convenience store clerk, she inadvertently humiliates Mei in public.

That night, Mei has a vivid nightmare involving red pandas. When she wakes up the next morning, she has transformed into a large red panda. She hides from her parents and discovers that she transforms only when she is in a state of high emotion. When she reverts to human form her hair remains red, and so she goes to school in a touque. Ming initially believes Mei is experiencing her first period, but learns the truth when she humiliates her at school, causing Mei to transform and run home in panic and tears.

Ming and Jin explain that Sun Yee was granted this transformation to protect her daughters and her village during wartime, and that all her female descendants have also had this ability. This has become inconvenient and dangerous in modern times, so the red panda spirit must be sealed in a talisman by a ritual on the night of a lunar eclipse, which will take place in a month's time. Mei's friends discover her transformation, but take a liking to it; Mei finds that concentrating on them enables her to control her transformations.

Ming allows Mei to resume her normal life, but refuses to let Mei attend 4*Town's upcoming concert. Instead, the girls secretly raise money for the tickets at school by exploiting the popularity of Mei's red panda form while lying to Ming about how Mei is spending her time. To raise the last $100, Mei agrees to attend school bully Tyler's birthday party as the red panda. At the party, Mei is upset to discover that the concert will be on the night she is to undergo the ritual. In her rage, she attacks Tyler when he insults her family, frightening the other kids. Ming discovers Mei's activities and accuses her friends of corrupting and taking advantage of her. Ashamed of her actions and afraid to stand up to her mother, Mei fails to come to her friends' defense.

To Ming's dismay, Mei's grandmother and aunts arrive to assist with Mei's ritual. As Mei prepares herself, Jin finds videos she recorded of herself as the red panda with her friends and tells her she should not be ashamed of this side of her, but to embrace it. During the ritual, as Mei's red panda form is about to be sealed, she decides to keep her powers and abandons the ritual to attend the concert at the SkyDome; in making her escape, she breaks Ming's talisman, releasing her red panda form as well. At the concert she reconciles with her friends and discovers that Tyler is also a 4*Town fan. However, an enraged Ming, having become a kaiju-sized red panda, disrupts the concert, intending to take Mei back by force.

Mei and Ming argue about the former's independence. As they quarrel, Mei accidentally knocks her mother unconscious. Mei's grandmother and aunts break their talismans to use their red panda forms to help drag Ming into a new ritual circle. Mei's friends and 4*Town join in singing to complete the ritual, sending Mei, Ming, and the other women to the astral plane. Mei reconciles with her mother. She helps her mend her bond with her own mother, whom Ming accidentally scarred in anger before her own red panda form was sealed. The other women contain their red pandas in new talismans; but Mei decides to keep hers, and Ming accepts that she is finding her own path.

Later, as the Lee family raises money to repair the damage to the SkyDome, Mei and Ming's relationship has improved. Mei balances her temple duties—where her red panda is now an attraction—with spending time with her friends, who now include Tyler.

Voice cast
 Rosalie Chiang as Meilin "Mei" Lee, a 13-year-old girl
 Sandra Oh as Ming Lee, Mei's strict and overprotective mother
 Ava Morse as Miriam Mendelsohn, a singing tomboy with braces who is one of Mei's best friends.
 Maitreyi Ramakrishnan as Priya Mangal, a mellow girl who is one of Mei's best friends
 Hyein Park as Abby Park, an energetic and aggressive girl and the shortest of Mei's best friends
 Orion Lee as Jin Lee, Mei's quiet yet supportive father
 Wai Ching Ho as Wu, Mei's grandmother and Ming's mother
 Tristan Allerick Chen as Tyler Nguyen-Baker, Mei's classmate with braces who initially picks on Mei
 James Hong as Mr. Gao, a local elder and shaman, and friend of the Lee family
 Addie Chandler as Devon, a local convenience store clerk and Mei's secret crush
 Sasha Roiz as Mr. Kieslowski, Mei's high-school teacher
 Lily Sanfelippo as Stacy Frick, one of Mei's classmates who sees her red panda form in the restroom
 Anne-Marie as Lauren, one of Mei's classmates (U.K. version)

Mei's aunts (Chen, Ping, Helen and Lily) are voiced by Lori Tan Chinn, Lillian Lim, Sherry Cola and Mia Tagano. The members of the 4*Town boy band (Robaire, Jesse, Aaron Z., Aaron T. and Tae Young) are voiced by Jordan Fisher, Finneas O'Connell, Josh Levi, Topher Ngo and Grayson Villanueva.

Production

Development
In 2017, Shi had recently completed the Pixar short Bao when Pixar invited her to pitch three ideas for a full-length film. Her proposed concepts were all coming-of-age stories centered on teenage girls. The one that became Turning Red was based on a girl going through a "magical puberty", which Shi wrote based on her own personal experiences. Shi said, "Everyone has been there. Everyone has been 13 and feeling like they're turning into some wild, hairy, hormonal beast, and I think that's why Pixar was drawn to it". Shi pitched all three concepts, including Turning Red, to Pixar on October 31, 2017. According to Pixar producer Lindsey Collins, who sat in on Shi's pitch meeting, the Pixar staff were drawn to the Turning Red idea as "it was so clear that Domee had such a sense of who these two main characters were, that Mei and Ming were really clear and special and unique, more than any of the other ideas" and that "she had this really personal experience with these two characters that were kind of versions of her own life. That's like the magic equation, right there". The approach of using more personable stories followed from Luca under Pixar's new chief creative officer Pete Docter's oversight, which shifted the direction the studio took with both storytelling and film production. Brenda Hsueh, writer of the upcoming Pixar film Elemental, worked on the film as a consultant to Shi for the ideas.

The film was developed under the working title of Red. Shi was announced as writer and director of an upcoming Pixar full-length film on May 8, 2018, making her the first woman to solely direct a film in the studio. The film's creative leads were also the first all-female team for Pixar, which Pixar's CEO Jim Morris said "happened very organically" rather than by intent. Rona Liu served as production designer, after doing so for Bao. Liu said that working on a feature film was "a dream come true". By November 26, 2018, Shi confirmed that the film was in early stages of development, with the story still being worked on, and that "[she is] really excited to play in this new 90-minute film format". The title Turning Red was finalized by December 10, 2020. According to Morris, Turning Red had one of the fastest development times of a Pixar feature film, taking only four years to complete.

Casting
In 2017, Pixar hired Chiang to provide scratch vocals to support the development of the film. Chiang, then only 12 years old, was selected in part because she was a local child actor conveniently based in nearby Fremont, which is only about 35 miles (56 km) from Pixar's Emeryville headquarters. After two years of development, Shi and Collins reached the point where the film was "solid" enough to start casting professional voice actors. Despite listening to various auditions, the two realized they had already fallen in love with Chiang's scratch vocals and could not envision anyone else playing Mei. They escalated the issue to Pixar chief creative officer Pete Docter, who personally approved the casting of Chiang in the film's lead role.

During an early 2020 recording session, Shi suddenly surprised Chiang with an additional script page where Shi, reading in character as Ming, offered Chiang the role. This session, right before the onset of the COVID-19 pandemic in the United States, turned out to be their last one conducted in person. To keep production going, Pixar shipped an enormous amount of professional audio equipment to Chiang, who turned one of the rooms in her parents' house into a makeshift recording studio.

Sandra Oh was Shi's top pick for Ming. Besides the fact that Oh was a fellow Canadian, Shi felt Oh could convey the range of complex emotions they wished to portray in Ming.

Design

Setting
The film takes place in Toronto, Ontario, Canada in 2002, as confirmed by a production designer in February 2021. As it takes place through the eyes of a 13-year-old girl named Mei Lee, the entire environment has been stylized to convey a specific feeling; Shi described the film's overall look as an "Asian tween fever dream". According to executive producer Dan Scanlon, "It feels more like a very soft, colorful, magical, idyllic, almost youthful version of the city". Shi also considered how video games like Pokémon, EarthBound and The Legend of Zelda: Breath of the Wild were able to "stylize their world in such an appealing, chunky, cute kind of way". Part of this desired setting was capturing the popularity of boy bands at the turn of the millennium and how teenage girls reacted to them. Pixar animators visited locations around Northern California for inspiration and visual references. They studied red pandas at the San Francisco Zoo, and looked at architecture in Chinatown in San Francisco and the Bok Kai Temple in Marysville.

Inspirations
Shi said that several anime influenced the film, including Sailor Moon, Ranma ½, Fruits Basket, and Inuyasha. To capture these anime influences, hand-drawn 2D animated effects were added atop Pixar's 3D animation. Shi was also inspired by My Neighbor Totoro, in creating an "iconic grabbable giant animal that you just want to rub your face in". Nintendo games, such as Earthbound, Pokémon and The Legend of Zelda, have also been cited as a major influence for the film. Shi also compared the plot of the film to Disney's A Goofy Movie, a similar coming-of-age movie involving a parent and child trying to mend their relationship, with a pop band as part of the film's climax. The film also deals with puberty, though the film does not directly talk of biological changes. For example, Mei's mother mistakes Mei's reaction to her transformation for her first menstruation. Shi said they were "unapologetic" about the discussion of these topics in the film; the title Turning Red is an allegory for menstruation. The color red also reflects other feelings experienced by teenagers, according to Shi, such as embarrassment or lust. Shi and her staff had feared that studio executives would want the scenes referencing puberty removed, but the scenes were accepted.

Liu oversaw the production of the food scenes, as she had done for Bao. They partnered with the non-profit organization Gold House that specializes in promotion of Asian and Pacific cultures to identify what foods to include. For rendering the foods, they were inspired by the approach that Studio Ghibli had done with foods in their works, as well as exaggerating their look in the same manner that Sanrio uses to bring cuteness into their products, and the way the film The God of Cookery showed food in a "dream glow".

Music

The film's music is scored by Ludwig Göransson in his first animated film project, and was recorded within a two-week period after COVID-19 lockdown relaxations. The film also featured three original songs written by Billie Eilish and Finneas O'Connell: "Nobody Like U," "1 True Love," and "U Know What's Up." These songs were performed in the film by the fictional boy band 4*Town, which O'Connell was a part of. Producer Lindsey Collins said that her child was a fan of Eilish's music, which inspired her to approach Eilish and O'Connell at the start of production. Collins had pitched to their pair using scrapbook featuring scenes from the film and cutouts of the duo. Walt Disney Records released the soundtrack album digitally and on CD on March 11, 2022. Subsequently, tracks from 4*Town appeared in multiple languages, some of which were performed by boy bands such as Da-iCE (Japanese) and W0LF(S) (Mandarin). The album debuted at number 187 on the Billboard 200 chart on the week of March 21, 2022, and peaked at #87 on the week of April 9, 2022.

Marketing

Promotion

A first look of the film was shown at the Disney Investor Day on December 10, 2020. The teaser trailer premiered on July 13, 2021, as the official trailer premiered on November 17, 2021. In the lead up to the film's release, Disney partnered with Mozilla to promote the film via the Firefox web browser, as red pandas are also known as "firefoxes". Users on mobile and desktop are able to apply custom backgrounds and themes within the browser, respectively. According to Mozilla's chief marketing office Lindsey Shepard, the collaboration gives Mozilla the opportunity "to bring [the] Mozilla ethos to the new generation". One of the red pandas at the San Francisco Zoo was renamed Meilin on the day of the film's release. Air Canada decorated an Airbus A220 with images of Mei and her "red panda form" to fly over Canada promoting the film, and also had a contest for the public to attend the premiere in Toronto and win special prizes. A large statue of Mei as a red panda was placed in Toronto next to the CN Tower, Ripley's Aquarium, Roundhouse Park, Scotiabank Arena and the Rogers Centre (formerly known as Air Canada Centre and the Skydome, respectively) where passerby could have their photos taken with the statue. iSpot.tv reported that Disney had spent $23 million on television spots for Turning Red, which was more than what the studio spent on Black Widow, Jungle Cruise ($19.5 million), and Cruella ($12.6 million), and what Netflix spent on its most-watched film, Red Notice ($3.3 million). Since February 21, 2022, the trailer for the film had been the 16th-most-seen TV spot of all time.

Tie-in media
Disney licensed several books based on the film, which were released both before and after the U.S. premiere, including novelizations, short stories, a sticker album, a behind-the-scenes book and coloring books. A manga focused on 4*Town, titled 4*Town 4*Real, is set to be released by Viz Media on April 25, 2023. On February 27, 2023, it was announced that Red Panda Mei would become a meet-and-greet character at Shanghai Disneyland for a limited time, from March 1 to May 31, 2023.

Release

Theatrical and streaming
Turning Red had special screenings that took place in London at Everyman Borough Yards on February 21, 2022, and in Toronto at TIFF Bell Lightbox on March 8, 2022. It premiered at the El Capitan Theatre in Hollywood on March 1, 2022. It was originally scheduled for theatrical release in the United States on March 11, 2022, by Walt Disney Studios Motion Pictures. On June 17, 2021, a Pixar insider reaffirmed the film would have a theatrical release after both Soul (2020) and Luca (2021) were assigned direct-to-streaming releases on Disney+ in response to the COVID-19 pandemic. However, as the Omicron variant cases rose, on January 7, 2022, the decision was made to shift the film from its theatrical release to its direct-to-streaming release on Disney+ as a Disney+ original. In international markets where Disney+ was not available, it was released theatrically. In February 2022, it was announced that it would play a one-week theatrical engagement at Hollywood's El Capitan Theatre from March 11–17, 2022. It also began playing at Manhattan's AMC Empire 25 and Oakland's Grand Lake Theatre the same day it was released to Disney+, as well as several Showcase Cinema de Lux venues across the United Kingdom. Disney canceled the Russian release in response to the 2022 Russian invasion of Ukraine on February 28, 2022. Embrace the Panda: Making Turning Red, a 48-minute documentary about the film especially focusing on its all-female creative team, was released on Disney+ the same day.

Home media
Turning Red was released on digital services on April 26, 2022, and by Walt Disney Studios Home Entertainment on 4K Ultra HD, Blu-ray and DVD on May 3, 2022.

Reception

Box office
As of September 2022, Turning Red has earned $20.1 million outside the U.S. and Canada. It earned $3.8 million from 12 international markets in the opening weekend, with second-place openings in Saudi Arabia ($920,000), Poland ($430,000) and the United Arab Emirates ($420,000). It earned $2.8 million in its second weekend and $1.7 million in its third. The film is ranked first on the list of "Biggest Money Losers, Based on Absolute Loss on Worldwide Earnings" by film industry data website The Numbers.

Viewership
According to Samba TV, Turning Red was streamed in 2.5 million U.S. households over its opening weekend, the most-ever for a Disney+ original title. According to Nielsen, Turning Red was the most watched program across all streaming services in the U.S. with 1.7 billion minutes viewed for the week of March 7 to 13, 2022. It continued to hold the top position during March 14 to 20, 2022, with 1.675 billion minutes. According to Nielsen, Turning Red became the second most-watched movie on U.S. streaming services in 2022 with 11.4 billion minutes viewed.

Critical response
The website's consensus reads, "Heartwarming, humorous, beautifully animated, and culturally expansive, Turning Red extends Pixar's long list of family-friendly triumphs". Metacritic, which uses a weighted average, assigned the film a score of 83 out of 100 based on 52 critics, indicating "universal acclaim".

The Washington Posts Michael O'Sullivan gave 4 stars out of 4 and concludes: "[The film] delivers a bigger, and in some ways more universal message: It’s okay to not always be in control, to let your freak flag fly. To paraphrase Sigmund Freud, sometimes a red panda is just a red panda. And sometimes it’s a metaphor for that inner spark of creativity, the flame of originality that is to be cherished, not extinguished. With 'Turning Red,' Shi demonstrates that she's got it, in spades". The Guardians Benjamin Lee gave 3 stars out of 5 and concludes: "The journey is slick and diverting, and at times incisive, but Turning Red is yet another Pixar film that coasts rather than glides. Hopefully its next offering can turn into something more". IGNs Siddhant Adlakha gave a rating of 9 out of 10 and concludes: "A story of magical transformation as a metaphor for personal and cultural change, Turning Red (from Bao director Domee Shi) is Pixar's funniest and most imaginative film in years. It captures the wild energy of adolescence, uses pop stars as a timeless window into puberty, and tells a tale of friendship and family in the most delightfully kid-friendly way". Chicago Sun-Times' Richard Roeper gave 2.5 stars out of 4 and comments that "The problems are mostly with the script, which often requires Meilin to be almost irritatingly obnoxious. Meanwhile, her mother behaves like a monster for much of the story, which takes on an increasingly supernatural element to the point where there’s a 'Ghostbusters' homage". The film was also praised for its realistic depiction of  female friendships and their ups and downs, which producer Lindsey Collins credited to having mostly women on the creative team.

CinemaBlend Sean O'Connell called the focus on a Chinese Canadian girl as "limiting" to a broad audience: "By rooting Turning Red very specifically in the Asian community of Toronto, the film legitimately feels like it was made for Domee Shi's friends and immediate family members. Which is fine – but also, a tad limiting in its scope". The review received backlash by members of the press on social media, calling it "sexist" and "racist"; crew and cast members of the movie eventually spoke up on the case. Lead voice actor Rosalie Chiang said the film was meant to appeal to all: "This is a coming of age film, everyone goes through this change ... I think different people of different cultures are going to go through it differently, but at the end of the day, the core messiness and change is something everyone can relate to". As a result of the pushback, CinemaBlend editor-in-chief Mack Rawden pulled O'Connell's review and apologized publicly for it and that the site had "failed to properly edit" the review before posting; O'Connell also posted his own apology for the review.

The attention drawn by O'Connell's review led to parents and other audience critics to raise further issues with the film due to the character specificity, bringing up concerns that the film, aimed at a family audience, brings up the issues of menstruation, teenage crushes and sexuality, and disobedience towards one's parents, which these people felt were topics best left for parents to discuss with their children on their own. The New Yorker's Jane Hu echoed O'Connell's views, accusing the film of relying on Asian stereotypes and of being "hyper-specific and alienating." Movie critics for The New York Times, The Atlantic, The Daily Beast, and Vox responded that these are natural topics that reflect the realities of 13-year-old girls and should not be considered taboo, and praised the film for its honest portrayal of these behaviors.

Accolades

Future 
Domee Shi has expressed interest in a follow-up, stating: "We are open, but we haven't talked about it. But yeah, it's an invitation at the end for more stories". Chiang and Oh also expressed interest and came up with ideas for a sequel or a prequel.

Notes

References

External links

 
 
 

2022 films
2022 comedy films
2022 computer-animated films
2022 directorial debut films
2020s American animated films
2020s coming-of-age comedy films
2020s English-language films
2020s fantasy comedy films
2020s teen comedy films
2020s teen drama films
2020s teen fantasy films
American animated comedy films
American coming-of-age comedy films
American computer-animated films
American fantasy comedy films
American high school films
American monster movies
American musical comedy films
American musical fantasy films
American teen comedy films
American teen comedy-drama films
American teen musical films
Animated films about families
Animated films about friendship
Animated films about music and musicians
Anime-influenced Western animation
Films about Chinese Americans
Films about Chinese Canadians
Chinese-Canadian culture in Toronto
Disney+ original films
Film and television memes
Films about curses
Films about fear
Films about puberty
Animated films about shapeshifting
Films directed by Domee Shi
Films impacted by the COVID-19 pandemic
Films scored by Ludwig Göransson
Films set in 2002
Films set in Toronto
Giant monster films
IMAX films
Middle school films
Films about mother–daughter relationships
2020s female buddy films
Pixar animated films
Animated coming-of-age films
Walt Disney Pictures animated films